Iva Mocová is a retired international Czech football defender last played for Sparta Prague.

She had been a member of the Czech national team from 2003. That same year she first played the UEFA Women's Cup with Slavia Prague. Mocová scored two goals in the 2011 World Cup qualifying. She subsequently scored the Czech Republic's first goal in the 2013 Euro qualifying in a 1–1 tie against Austria.

Career honours

Club
Sparta
Czech First Division (9): 2004–05, 2005–06, 2006–07, 2007–08, 2008–09, 2009–10, 2010–11, 2011–12, 2012-13, 2017-18
 Czech Women's Cup (9): 2007–08, 2008–09, 2009–10, 2010–11, 2011–12, 2012–13, 2014–15, 2016–17, 2017–18

Slavia
Czech First Division (2): 2002–03, 2003–04

References

1980 births
Living people
Czech women's footballers
Czech Republic women's international footballers
People from Frýdlant
Women's association football forwards
SK Slavia Praha (women) players
AC Sparta Praha (women) players
Czech football managers
Czech Women's First League players
Sportspeople from the Liberec Region